Andrew Lih (born 1968) is a Chinese-American new media researcher, consultant and writer, as well as an authority on both Wikipedia and internet censorship in the People's Republic of China. In 2013 he was appointed an associate professor of journalism at American University in Washington, D.C.

He is currently Wikimedian at large at the Smithsonian Institution and Wikimedia Strategist at The Metropolitan Museum of Art in New York City.

Life and career

Lih worked as a software engineer for AT&T Bell Labs from 1990 to 1993. He founded the new-media startup Mediabridge Infosystems, Inc., in 1994 – online publisher of ny.com. He also obtained a Master's degree in Computer Science from Columbia University in 1994.

From 1995 to 2000 he served as an adjunct professor of journalism at Columbia, and director of technology for their Center for New Media.  In 2000 he formed Columbia's Interactive Design Lab, a collaboration with the university's School of the Arts to explore interactive design for both fiction and non-fiction, including advertising, news, documentaries and films. Soon afterward, Lih served as an assistant professor and the Director of Technology at the Journalism and Media Studies Centre of the University of Hong Kong.

He then moved to Beijing, China, where he lived until 2009. In 2013 he became an associate professor at American University's School of Communication in Washington, D.C.

Wikipedia activity

Lih is a Wikipedia contributor and administrator on the English Wikipedia. In 2009, he published the book The Wikipedia Revolution: How a Bunch of Nobodies Created the World's Greatest Encyclopedia. Lih has been interviewed by Salon.com, The New York Times Freakonomics blog, and NPR Talk of the Nation as an expert on Wikipedia.

Lih has stated that editing Wikipedia with smartphones is difficult, hence discouraging new potential contributors. He also says that for several years running, the number of Wikipedia editors has been falling and that there is serious disagreement among existing contributors on how to resolve this. In 2015, Lih expressed fear that these situations could imperil Wikipedia's long-term future.

Selected publications

See also
 List of Wikipedia people

References

External links 

 
 

1968 births
Living people
Academic staff of the University of Hong Kong
American technology writers
American University faculty and staff
American writers of Chinese descent
Articles containing video clips
Columbia University faculty
University of Southern California faculty
American academics of Chinese descent
American Wikimedians
Wikipedia people